The UPM MRT station is a mass rapid transit (MRT) station at Universiti Putra Malaysia (UPM) in Serdang, Selangor, Malaysia. It is one of the stations on the MRT Putrajaya Line.

Location
The station is located near UPM's Agriculture Field 2 (Ladang 2) of the Faculty of Agriculture and the University Housing Complex (UHC), formerly known as International Transit House, all of which are accessible to the UPM main campus by walking distance.

Nearby Places
In addition to Universiti Putra Malaysia main campus, UPM MRT station also serves the nearby attractions and places of interest within 5km radius from the station. Apart from Farm Fresh attraction which is accessible via feeder bus T568, none of the MRT feeder buses are available to serve these areas. 
 Farm Fresh @ UPM
 Serdang Hospital
 Malaysian Agricultural Research and Development Institute (MARDI)
 Malaysia Agro Exposition Park Serdang (MAEPS)
 IOI City Mall

Bus Services

Feeder buses

References

See also
  LRT KL Gateway-Unversiti for University of Malaya
  KTM UKM for Universiti Kebangsaan Malaysia

External links
 Universiti Putra Malaysia MRT Station | mrt.com.my
 Klang Valley Mass Rapid Transit website
 MRT Hawk-Eye View

Rapid transit stations in Selangor
Sungai Buloh-Serdang-Putrajaya Line
University of Putra Malaysia